When in Spain is a foreign language studio album by Cliff Richard and The Shadows released in 1963. It is Richard's sixth studio album and tenth album overall. The album of Spanish standards reached number 8 on the UK Album Charts.

Track listing
Taken from the sleeve notes:
"Perfidia" (Alberto Domínguez)
"Amor Amor Amor"  (Ricardo Lopez Mendez, Gabriel Ruíz) with The Norrie Paramor Strings
"Frenesí" (Alberto Domínguez)
"Solamente una vez" ("You Belong to My Heart") (Agustín Lara)
"Vaya Con Dios" ("May God Be With You") (Larry Russell, Inez James, and Buddy Pepper) with The Norrie Paramor Strings
"Me Lo Dijo Adela" ("Sweet and Gentle") (Otilio Portal)
"Maria No Mas" ("Maria Ninguém") (Carlos Lyra, M. Salina)
"Tus Besos" ("Kiss") (Lionel Newman) with The Norrie Paramor Strings
"Quizás, Quizás, Quizás" ("Perhaps, Perhaps, Perhaps") (Osvaldo Farrés)
"Te Quiero, Dijiste" ("Magic is the Moonlight") (María Grever, Charles Pasquale)
"Canción de Orfeo" ("Carnival") (Antônio Maria, Luiz Bonfá) with The Norrie Paramor Strings
"Quién será" ("Sway") (Pablo Beltrán Ruiz)

Personnel
Taken from the sleeve notes and other references:
 Cliff Richard - lead vocals
 Norrie Paramor - producer
 The Norrie Paramor Strings

The Shadows:
 Hank Marvin - lead guitar
 Bruce Welch - rhythm guitar
 Brian Locking - bass guitar
 Brian Bennett - drums

References

External links
 Cliff Richard's official website

1963 albums
Cliff Richard albums
Albums produced by Norrie Paramor
Columbia Records albums
Spanish-language albums